Oakland Military Academy was founded in Oakland, New Jersey in the 1930s by the Sarcka family. During the 1950s, the military curriculum was discontinued, and the academy was moved to New Windsor, New York. The academic program was discontinued in the early 1970s, although the Oakland School of Horsemanship continued until about 1980, closing after the passing of John Sarcka.

Notable alumni
Alumni include many civic and business leaders. 

Fred Kummer, founder of the Adam's Mark hotel chain
Denzel Washington
Charles H. Mallery, Associate Dean, College of Arts & Sciences, University of Miami, Coral Gables, FL

References

Educational institutions established in 1935
Defunct schools in New Jersey
Defunct United States military academies
1935 establishments in New Jersey